Ambodilafa is a town and commune in Madagascar. It belongs to the district of Nosy Varika, which is a part of the region of Vatovavy. The population of the commune was 18.766 in 2018.

Geography
The commune lies at a distance of 94 km from Nosy Varika and 70 km off the crossroad at Ambandrika on the National Road 11.
Only an unpaved piste serves this town.

Transport
There is no transport available in Ambodilafa, nor for goods nor public transport.  The villagers use food transport to Sahavato (32 km).

Only primary schooling is available. The majority 99% of the population of the commune are farmers.  The most important crop is rice, while other important products are bananas, coffee and cassava. Services provide employment for 1% of the population.

References 

Populated places in Vatovavy